Hinduism is a minority religion in Punjab province of Pakistan followed by about 0.2% of its population. Punjab has the second largest number of Hindus in Pakistan after Sindh. Hinduism is followed mainly in the Southern Punjab districts of Rahim Yar Khan and Bahawalpur.

Hinduism has a strong historical presence in Punjab with many mandirs, shrines (samadhis), alongside various religious traditions and texts that were developed in the region. According to the 1941 census, Punjabi Hindus constituted approximately 13.7 percent of the population in the region that comprises the contemporary state of Punjab, Pakistan. With violence and religious cleansing accompanying the partition of India in 1947, the vast majority departed the region en masse, primarily migrating eastward to Delhi and the region of Punjab that would fall on the eastern side of the Radcliffe Line, in the contemporary Indian states of Punjab, Haryana, and Himachal Pradesh.

History

Ancient era 
The Rig Veda, the oldest and sacred Hindu text, is believed to have been composed in the Punjab region of modern-day Pakistan (and India) on the banks of the Indus River around 1500 BCE. The Punjab region also features heavily in the Mahabharata.   According to Hindu religious texts, Multan was founded by the Hindu sage Kashyapa and also asserts Multan as the capital of the Trigarta Kingdom ruled by the Katoch dynasty at the time of the Kurukshetra War that is central the Hindu epic poem, the Mahabharata.
Historically, the Punjabi Hindus and Saraiki Hindus followed mainly a Brahminical form of Hinduism. The Prahladpuri Temple in Multan is believed to be constructed by Prahlada in honor of Narasimha. Most of the Hindus in Punjab once also had also influence of Sikhism on their culture and lifestyle. Nanakpanthis are the Hindus who follows the teaching of Sikh guru, Guru Nanak.

Colonial era 
By the early 20th century, Western Punjab (present-day Punjab, Pakistan) had a Punjabi Muslim majority population (primarily supporting the Muslim League and Pakistan Movement) but also included significant Punjabi Hindu and Punjabi Sikh minority populations. 

According to the 1941 census, Punjabi Hindus constituted approximately 13.7 percent of the population in the region that comprises the contemporary state of Punjab, Pakistan, numbering around 2.4 million persons. Following the partition of Punjab, according to the 1951 census, the Hindu population declined to 33,052 persons or 0.2 percent due to religious cleansing violence alongside large-scale mass migration and population transfer to East Punjab, India and Delhi in the violent events of partition of India.

With the formation of independent Pakistan and India during the partition of India in 1947, approximately 3 million Punjabi Hindus migrated to India.

Demography

1941 census

2017 census 
According to the 2017 Census, Hinduism is followed by 0.19% of the population or about 2 lakh people including 11,000 scheduled caste Hindus. However according to the Pakistan Hindu Council, there are 349,230 Hindus in Punjab.  

According to estimates in religious minorities in Pakistan's elections, there are above 50,000 or more in 11 districts in Pakistan. All of these are in Sindh except the Rahim Yar Khan District in Punjab and is the only district in Punjab with more than 2% of its population as Hindu.

About 90% of the Hindus in Punjab province lives in Rahim Yar Khan and Bahawalpur.

Community life
Hindus in Punjab is mainly concentrated in the Southern Punjab districts. According to a study, the majority (86.5%) of the scheduled caste Hindus in Southern Punjab have experienced discrimination. The study found that majority (91.5%) of the respondents in Rahimyar Khan districts believed that political parties are not giving importance to them. In Central Punjab, the population of Hindus are very low, so many of the Hindus have married Sikhs and vice versa. Intermarriages between the Hindus and Sikh community are very common there. The Forced conversion of Hindu girls are a problem faced by the Hindu community. According to a report by Minority Rights Commission, the number of forced conversions and forced marriages increasing in South Punjab, particularly the Rahim Yar Khan District and adjacent areas.

The Hindu marriages in Punjab are registered under the Hindu marriage act of 2017.

Politics

Punjab Assembly has eight reserved seats for non-Muslims and most of them are Christians. In 1997, the Seth Bharta Ram became the first Hindu to be elected to the minority reserved seat in Punjab Provincial assembly. It was only after 16 years, another Hindu member Kanji Ram was elected to the provincial assembly. Currently there are no Hindu member in the 17th Punjab provincial assembly.

Hindus form a significant electoral role in the assembly seats of Rahim Yar Khan District.

Temples

There are many temples in the Punjab and mainly of them served as a worship place for multi-religious community. The notable of them includes: 
 Baba Ram Thaman Shrine
 Katas Raj Temples
 Krishna Temple, Rawalpindi
 Krishna Temple, Sadiqabad
 Multan Sun Temple
 Prahladpuri Temple, Multan
 Shivala Teja Singh temple
 Tilla Jogian
 Valmiki Mandir

See also

 Hinduism in Pakistan
 Punjabi Hindus 
 Hinduism in Balochistan
 Hinduism in Sindh province
 Hinduism in Khyber Pakhtunkhwa

Notes

References

External links 

 

Hinduism in Punjab, Pakistan
Religion in Punjab, Pakistan